Burnham Area Rescue Boat (BARB), also known as BARB Search & Rescue, is a voluntary independent search and rescue service, formed in 1992 in Burnham-on-Sea, Somerset that operates two rescue hovercraft and two inshore rescue boats in the Bridgwater Bay area. It is also a registered charity.

It mainly operates BBV hovercraft, which have been used to rescue people, animals and vehicles from the mudflats of the Bristol Channel, but also has two small inshore rescue boats. The construction of its boathouse on the seafront in 1994 was the subject of a television programme and took just three days.

History

Burnham-on-Sea is on the shore of the Bristol Channel and has a long sandy beach, but nearby mudflats and sandbanks have claimed several lives over the years.

A lifeboat had been provided in the town from 1836, but this was withdrawn in 1930 leaving coverage for the area to the  lifeboat.

A charity appeal was established in 1992, by members of the local sailing community, to equip the town with its own inshore rescue boat. In June 1994, the boathouse was built in the space of three days by Anneka Rice and a team of builders for the BBC TV series Challenge Anneka.
The site and technical support was provided by Sedgemoor District Council.

In June 2002, a five-year-old holidaymaker, Lelaina Hall, drowned on the mudflats at Berrow, north of the town.
An appeal was launched in association with the Association of Search and Rescue Hovercraft (since renamed Hovercraft Search and Rescue UK) and with the backing of the Western Daily Press. This raised £115,000 to buy a rescue hovercraft, which could operate on mud and in shallow water that was unapproachable for the inshore rescue boat. It arrived on 22 March 2003, and during its first year of operation up to 50 people were rescued.

BARB asked the Royal National Lifeboat Institution (RNLI) to take over inshore rescue boat work on the coast, which it did on 23 December 2003. The RNLI operates a  Rigid Inflatable Boat (RIB) and a  inflatable boat from Burnham-on-Sea Lifeboat Station, which is a short distance from the BARB boathouse and complements their hovercraft.

Boathouse

BARB headquarters, The Marine Rescue Centre, is a single-storey block building that matches the adjacent tourist information centre Burnham Information And Rescue Support (BIARS) and public conveniences. The boathouse is at the north end and the HM Coastguard have facilities at the other end of the building.

Fleet

Inshore rescue boat
The two inshore rescue boats are Arancia inflatable boats, that can operate in calm inland waters to assist Police with searches for missing persons, usually alongside Avon and Somerset Fire and Rescue Service. They are also used to help wildlife charities such as Secret World in small wildlife rescues. Their main role is use by BARB Search & rescue's Swift Water Team as part of Surf Life Saving GB.

Spirit of Lelania
The Spirit of Lelania is a six-seat BBV-6 hovercraft designed by Bill Baker Vehicles and built by Ivanoff Hovercraft AB, in Sweden in 2003.

In November 2010, the engine was replaced with a new  unit from a MG TF sports car, donated by the manufacturer MG Motor.

Light of Elizabeth
The Light Of Elizabeth is a four-seat BBV craft intended for training and to reach sites on the River Parrett where the larger hovercraft cannot operate. It entered service in August 2006.

A new larger Italian-designed hovercraft replaced Light Of Elizabeth in 2013. It was funded by donations from local individuals and groups, and is made of kevlar rather than fibreglass to make it more resilient.

See also
 Independent lifeboats in Britain and Ireland

References

External links

 
 

Independent Lifeboat stations
Lifeboat stations in Somerset
Hovercraft
Transport in Somerset
Charities based in Somerset
Sea rescue organisations of the United Kingdom
Burnham-on-Sea